Alexandrovka is a rural locality (a village) in Stepanovsky Selsoviet, Aurgazinsky District, Bashkortostan, Russia. The population was 179 as of 2010.

Geography 
Alexandrovka is located 17 km northwest of Tolbazy (the district's administrative centre) by road. Maryanovka is the nearest rural locality.

References 

Rural localities in Aurgazinsky District